Middlesex Savings Bank is a Massachusetts bank headquartered in Natick, Massachusetts, and founded in 1835.  It is the largest mutual bank in Massachusetts with more than $5.7 billion in assets and 32 branches in the western Boston suburbs.

History
The Middlesex Institution for Savings was founded on March 4, 1835 in Concord, Massachusetts. Natick Five Cents Savings Bank was founded in 1859. Medway Savings Bank was founded in 1871.

References

External links

1835 establishments in Massachusetts
Banks based in Massachusetts
Mutual savings banks in the United States
Banks established in 1835